Rushbury railway station was a station in Rushbury, Shropshire, England. The station was opened in 1867 and closed in 1951.
In 1892 a 15-lever signal box was added at the end of the platform.
The station had two members of staff, a station master and signal man who performed all the required duties

The station is now a private residence.

References

Further reading

Disused railway stations in Shropshire
Railway stations in Great Britain opened in 1867
Railway stations in Great Britain closed in 1951
Former Great Western Railway stations